Bazeh Hur (also Romanized as Bāzeh Ḩūr and Bazeh Hoor; also known as Bāzeh Khūr, Bāzhū, and Bāz-i-Hūr) is a village in Piveh Zhan Rural District, Ahmadabad District, Mashhad County, Razavi Khorasan Province, Iran. At the 2006 census, its population was 1,358, in 415 families.

References

Further reading 
 

Populated places in Mashhad County